The 2022 UEFA European Under-19 Championship qualifying competition was a men's under-19 football competition that determined the seven teams joining the automatically qualified hosts Slovakia in the 2022 UEFA European Under-19 Championship final tournament. Players born on or after 1 January 2003 were eligible to participate.

Originally, the qualifying competition would use a new format with teams split into three different leagues with promotion and relegation, with the draw of the first round under the new format already held in December 2019. However, on 17 June 2020, UEFA announced that the introduction of the new format had been postponed to the next edition due to the COVID-19 pandemic, and qualification for this edition would use the previous format involving two rounds only.

Apart from Slovakia, 53 of the remaining 54 UEFA member national teams entered the qualifying competition, where the original format consisted of a qualifying round that took place in autumn 2021, and an elite round that took place in spring 2022.

Format
The qualifying competition will consist of the following two rounds:
Qualifying round: Apart from Portugal, which receives a bye to the elite round as the team with the highest seeding coefficient, the remaining 52 teams are drawn into 13 groups of four teams. Each group is played in single round-robin format at one of the teams selected as hosts after the draw. The 13 group winners, the 13 runners-up, and the third-placed team with the best record against the first and second-placed teams in their group advance to the elite round.
Elite round: The 28 teams are drawn into seven groups of four teams. Each group is played in single round-robin format at one of the teams selected as hosts after the draw. The seven group winners qualify for the final tournament.

The schedule of each group is as follows, with two rest days between each matchday (Regulations Article 20.04):

Tiebreakers
In the qualifying round and elite round, teams are ranked according to points (3 points for a win, 1 point for a draw, 0 points for a loss), and if tied on points, the following tiebreaking criteria are applied, in the order given, to determine the rankings (Regulations Articles 14.01 and 14.02):
Points in head-to-head matches among tied teams;
Goal difference in head-to-head matches among tied teams;
Goals scored in head-to-head matches among tied teams;
If more than two teams are tied, and after applying all head-to-head criteria above, a subset of teams are still tied, all head-to-head criteria above are reapplied exclusively to this subset of teams;
Goal difference in all group matches;
Goals scored in all group matches;
Penalty shoot-out if only two teams have the same number of points, and they met in the last round of the group and are tied after applying all criteria above (not used if more than two teams have the same number of points, or if their rankings are not relevant for qualification for the next stage);
Disciplinary points (red card = 3 points, yellow card = 1 point, expulsion for two yellow cards in one match = 3 points);
UEFA coefficient ranking for the qualifying round draw;
Drawing of lots.

To determine the best third-placed team from the qualifying round, the results against the teams in fourth place are discarded. The following criteria are applied (Regulations Articles 15.01 and 15.02):
Points;
Goal difference;
Goals scored;
Disciplinary points (total 3 matches);
UEFA coefficient ranking for the qualifying round draw;
Drawing of lots.

Qualifying round

Draw
The draw for the qualifying round was held on 3 December 2019, 10:00 CET (UTC+1), at the UEFA headquarters in Nyon, Switzerland.

The teams were seeded according to their coefficient ranking, calculated based on the following:
2016 UEFA European Under-19 Championship final tournament and qualifying competition (qualifying round and elite round)
2017 UEFA European Under-19 Championship final tournament and qualifying competition (qualifying round and elite round)
2018 UEFA European Under-19 Championship final tournament and qualifying competition (qualifying round and elite round)
2019 UEFA European Under-19 Championship final tournament and qualifying competition (qualifying round and elite round)

Each group contained one team from Pot A, one team from Pot B, one team from Pot C, and one team from Pot D. Based on the decisions taken by the UEFA Emergency Panel, the following pairs of teams could not be drawn in the same group: Spain and Gibraltar, Ukraine and Russia, Serbia and Kosovo, Russia and Kosovo, Bosnia and Herzegovina and Kosovo.

Notes
Teams marked in bold have qualified for the final tournament.

Groups
The qualifying round was originally scheduled to be played by 17 November 2020. However, due to the COVID-19 pandemic in Europe, UEFA announced on 13 August 2020 that after consultation with the 55 member associations, the qualifying round would be delayed to March 2021.

Times up to 27 March 2022 are CET (UTC+1), thereafter times are CEST (UTC+2), as listed by UEFA (local times, if different, are in parentheses).

Group 1

Group 2

Group 3

Group 4

Group 5

Group 6

Group 7

Group 8

Group 9

Group 10

Group 11

Group 12

Group 13

Ranking of third-placed teams
To determine the best third-placed team from the qualifying round which advance to the elite round, only the results of the third-placed teams against the first and second-placed teams in their group are taken into account.

Elite round

Draw
The draw for the elite round was held on 8 December 2021, at the UEFA headquarters in Nyon, Switzerland.

The teams were seeded according to their positions and then results (i.e. group winners were seeded higher than second-placed teams, the best third-placed team was seeded at the bottom) in the qualifying round. Portugal, which received a bye to the elite round, was automatically seeded into Pot A. Each group contained one team from Pot A, one team from Pot B, one team from Pot C, and one team from Pot D. Winners and runners-up from the same qualifying round group could not be drawn in the same group, but the best third-placed teams could be drawn in the same group as winners or runners-up from the same qualifying round group.

Groups
The elite round group stage is to be completed by played on 23, 26 and 29 March 2022, the exact dates and hosts for each group are to be confirmed.

Group 1

Group 2

Group 3

Group 4

Group 5

Group 6

Group 7

Qualified teams
The following eight teams qualify for the final tournament.

1 Bold indicates champions for that year. Italic indicates hosts for that year.
2 As Serbia and Montenegro

Goalscorers
In the qualifying round 

In the elite round 

In total,

References

External links

Under-19 Matches: 2021 Qualifying, UEFA.com

Qualification
2021
2021 in youth association football
2022 in youth association football
Association football events postponed due to the COVID-19 pandemic
Sports events affected by the 2022 Russian invasion of Ukraine